

Qualification system
A total of 80 table tennis athletes (40 men and 40 women) will qualify to compete at the games. A nation may enter a maximum of three athletes per gender. As host nation, Canada automatically qualifies a full team of six athletes. All other athletes will qualify at the qualification tournament in March 2015. Each region (Central America, Caribbean and South America) will qualify two teams each during the qualification event, along with the top three ranked teams as of the January ITTF Rankings. The final two spots will be awarded in a tournament organized immediately after the qualification event, open to all teams not yet qualified. The individual qualification will be held after both these tournaments.

A total of twelve teams per gender (3 athletes per team) will qualify along with four individual athletes per each gender.

Qualification timeline

Qualification summary

Men

Women

References

External links
ITTF Team Ranking

P
Qualification for the 2015 Pan American Games
Table tennis at the 2015 Pan American Games